O"Bash'Kaan'Da'Gaang/Washagamis Bay First Nation is an Ojibwe First Nation in northwestern Ontario, Canada.  Before the signing of Treaty 3 agreement there were three Anishinabe tribes living near and around the Kenora region.  The smallest was O'Bash'Kaan'Da'Gaang (Washagamis Bay-38A), the second was Niisaachewaan (Dalles-38C) and the largest was Wauzhusk Onigum (Rat Portage-38B).  It has two reserves; Agency 30 and Rat Portage near Kenora. It is a member of the Bimose Tribal Council and the Grand Council of Treaty 3.

First Nations governments in Ontario
Communities in Thunder Bay District